State Route 61 (SR 61) is a state highway in the U.S. state of California, running along the eastern edge of Oakland International Airport and through Alameda. Two additional "hidden" state highways, State Route 112 (SR 112) and State Route 260 (SR 260), are also signed as part of SR 61, despite having legal descriptions separate from Route 61.

SR 112 runs along Davis Street from State Route 185 (East 14th Street) west to Doolittle Drive in San Leandro. SR 61 proper then follows Doolittle Drive north near the eastern boundary of Oakland International Airport to Bay Farm Island and across the Bay Farm Island Bridge to Alameda Island. SR 61 then runs on various city streets in Alameda to Webster Street. SR 260 then goes from Webster Street through the Posey and Webster Street tubes to near Interstate 880 in Oakland. As early as 2012, a sign indicating SR 61 East near the I-880 interchange was replaced with an SR 112 shield; as of 2021, that sign remains as the only signage for SR 112.

As legislatively defined, Route 61 extends as far north as Albany and as far south as the Dumbarton Bridge's east approach.  Only the portion between Routes 260 and 112 is constructed; the unbuilt remainder of the route exists today either as open San Francisco Bay or wetlands.  This route would likely have sat atop landfill; as public opinion shifted against filling in the bay, completing the remaining portions of Route 61 also fell out of favor. Route 87 is another highway once proposed to traverse present-day wetlands and open water.

Route description
The combined SR 112/61/260 route begins at SR 185 in San Leandro. Running along Davis Street, it then interchanges with Interstate 880 before it heads to Doolittle Drive. It then continues northward along Doolittle Drive and enters the city of Oakland, running along the eastern boundary of Oakland International Airport. The highway then enters the city of Alameda at Bay Farm Island before crossing the San Leandro Bay via a drawbridge to Alameda Island. SR 61 then goes west along Otis Drive, then north along Broadway until reaching Encinal Avenue. The route then heads west on Encinal Avenue and Central Avenue to Webster Street. The highway then runs across Webster Street and through the Posey and Webster Street tubes before terminating at I-880 and 7th Street in Oakland. The route does not directly intersect with I-880 here, so drivers are instructed to get onto I-880 south via Oak Street or I-880 north via Jackson Street. There are two tube entrances on the Oakland side, one on Webster Street, and the other at the intersection of Broadway and 5th Street; the latter can be reached from I-880's Broadway off-ramps.

California's legislature has relinquished state control of the segment along Webster Street between Central Avenue and Atlantic Avenue, and thus that portion is now maintained by the City of Alameda.

SR 61 is part of the California Freeway and Expressway System, and all three routes are part of the National Highway System, a network of highways that are considered essential to the country's economy, defense, and mobility by the Federal Highway Administration.

Major intersections

See also

References

External links

California @ AARoads.com - State Route 61
Caltrans: Route 61 road conditions
From California Highways:
SR 61
SR 112
SR 260

061
State Route 061